Andella Ibrahim (born 2 May 1985 in Lokoja, Kogi State) is a Nigerian footballer.

Career 
He played the 2012 season with Niger Tornadoes F.C. and represented his team as team captain. 
The defender left Jigawa Golden Stars F.C. in March 2013 and signed for Kaduna United F.C.

International
Ibrahim represented his country Nigeria at 2001 FIFA U-17 World Championship in Trinidad and Tobago.

References

Nigerian footballers
Beitar Jerusalem F.C. players
Maccabi Tel Aviv F.C. players
Expatriate footballers in Israel
1985 births
Living people
Sunshine Stars F.C. players
Association football defenders
Wikki Tourists F.C. players
Israeli Premier League players
Nigerian Muslims
People from Akure
Jigawa Golden Stars F.C. players